The Coupe de France 1995–96 was its 79th edition. It was won by AJ Auxerre.

Round of 16

Quarter-finals

Semi-finals

Final

Topscorer
Marc Libbra (5 goals)

References

French federation
1995–96 Coupe de France at ScoreShelf.com

1995–96 domestic association football cups
1995–96 in French football
1995-96